Resident may refer to:

People and  functions 
 Resident minister, a representative of a government in a foreign country
 Resident (medicine), a stage of postgraduate medical training
 Resident (pharmacy), a stage of postgraduate pharmaceutical training
Resident engineer, an engineer or expert who works at client-side
 Resident, a person who maintains residency (domicile) in a given place
 Resident, a person who has tax residence in a country or jurisdiction
 Resident, a patient at a long-term care facility or senior center
 Resident (Second Life), a member of the Second Life community
 Resident DJ, a DJ who performs at a venue on a regular basis or permanently
 Resident spy, a spy who operates in a foreign country

Culture 
 Resident (magazine), an Austrian music magazine
 The Resident (film), a 2011 film starring Hilary Swank, Jeffrey Dean Morgan and Christopher Lee
 The Resident (TV series), a 2018 American medical drama television series airing on Fox that was created by Amy Holden Jones
 The Residents, an American avant garde music and visual arts group

Other
 Resident module, a program that stays in memory throughout the lifetime of a computing session
 Resident bird, a bird that does not migrate

See also 
 Residence
 Residency (disambiguation)